Eduardo Nesim Bitran Colodro (born 3 August 1957) is a Chilean civil engineer and politician who served for the two governments of Michelle Bachelet.

References

1957 births
Living people
Chilean people of Jewish descent
University of Chile alumni
Boston University alumni
21st-century Chilean politicians
Party for Democracy (Chile) politicians
Government ministers of Chile
Public works ministers
People from Ovalle